Schistura xhatensis is a species of ray-finned fish, a stone loach, in the genus Schistura. It has been recorded once, in 1999, on the Nam Xhat River, in the Nam Khan drainage, a tributary of the Mekong in Laos.

References

X
Cyprinid fish of Asia
Endemic fauna of Laos
Fish of Laos
Fish described in 2000